Khonjuk (also Romanized as Khonjūk and Khonjūk; also known as Sūnū) is a village in Paskuh Rural District, Sedeh District, Qaen County, South Khorasan Province, Iran. At the 2006 census, its population was 237, in 65 families.

References 

Populated places in Qaen County